Events from the year 1890 in Italy.

Kingdom of Italy
Monarch – Umberto I (1878–1900)
Prime Minniester – Francesco Crispi (1887–1891)

Events
The 1889 Italian Penal Code, commonly known as Zanardelli Code enters into force. It was named after Giuseppe Zanardelli, then Minister of Justice, who promoted the approval of the code. It unified penal legislation in Italy, abolished capital punishment and recognised the right to strike.

January 
 January 1 – The Kingdom of Italy establishes Italian Eritrea as its colony in the Horn of Africa.

March 

 [unknown day] – Verdi completes his first Act of the opera Falstaff.

May 
 May 17 – The opera Cavalleria Rusticana by Pietro Mascagni premiers at the Teatro Costanzi in Rome.
 May 31 – The Teatro Massimo Bellini opera house in Catania, Sicily, named after the local-born composer Vincenzo Bellini, is inaugurated with a performance of the composer's masterwork, Norma.

June 
 June 27 – In the First Battle of Agordat Italy defeats Mahdist Sudan.

October 
 October 15 – The Ab apostolici papal encyclical against Freemasonry in Italy is promulgated by Pope Leo XIII.

November 
 November 15 – The French, café-chantant inspired Salone Margherita is officially opened by the Marino brothers in Naples.
November 23 – First round of the Italian general election.
 November 30 – Second round of the Italian general election. The "ministerial" left-wing bloc of the Historical Left led by Francesco Crispi emerged as the largest in Parliament, winning 401 of the 508 seats.

December 
 December 9 – The Finance Minister, Giovanni Giolitti, and the Minister of Public Works, Gaspare Finali, resign over a contrast on the Ministry of Public Works expenses.

Births
 January 10 – Pina Menichelli, Italian silent film actress (d. 1984)
 January 19 – Ferruccio Parri, Italian partisan and Prime Minister (d. 1981)
 February 11 – Anton Giulio Bragaglia, pioneer in Futurist photography and Futurist cinema (d. 1960)
 February 16 – Francesco de Pinedo, Italian aviator (d. 1933)
 March 20 – Beniamino Gigli, Italian tenor (d. 1957)
July 20 – Giorgi Morandi, Italian modernist painter and printmaker (d.1964)
 September 10 – Elsa Schiaparelli, Italian fashion designer (d. 1973)

Deaths
 8 January - Giorgio Ronconi, operatic baritone (b. 1810)
April 10 – Aurelio Saffi, politician, active during the period of Italian unification close to Giuseppe Mazzini (b. 1819)
 October 26 – Carlo Collodi, Italian writer (The Adventures of Pinocchio) (b. 1826)

References

 
Italy
Years of the 19th century in Italy